Since it's creation in the 2007 municipal reform, Mogens Christian Gade from Venstre, had been mayor of Jammerbugt Municipality. In the previous election of 2017, Venstre won 14 and thereby a majority of seats for the first time. Venstre would lose a seat and lose their one-party majority in this election. However, Venstre still became the biggest party with 5 more seats than the Social Democrats, and on December 2, 2021, an agreement for a constitution between Social Democrats, Green Left, Danish People's Party and Venstre were announced. This would result in Mogens Christian Gade continuing as mayor.

Electoral system
For elections to Danish municipalities, a number varying from 9 to 31 are chosen to be elected to the municipal council. The seats are then allocated using the D'Hondt method and a closed list proportional representation.
Jammerbugt Municipality had 27 seats in 2021

Unlike in Danish General Elections, in elections to municipal councils, electoral alliances are allowed.

Electoral alliances  

Electoral Alliance 1

Electoral Alliance 2

Electoral Alliance 3

Results

References 

Jammerbugt